Saint Mura ( 550–645) was the first abbot of the monastery at Fahan, County Donegal, Ireland. He is the patron saint of Fahan. His feast is March 12.

References

Irish Roman Catholic saints
Patron saints